Havlagah ("The Restraint") was a strategic policy used by the Haganah members with regard to retribution taken against Arab groups who were attacking the Jewish settlements during the British Mandate of Palestine. Its core principles were fortification and abstention from taking revenge on Arabs by attacking innocent civilians. The political leadership and many leftwing Zionist groups supported the Havlagah policy.

Support
Many of the Zionist leadership saw Havlagah as a moral policy and a source of pride for the Jews.

Jewish National Council of Palestine
The Jewish National Council posted an announcement with their opinion of Havlagah:

Workers Party of the Land of Israel
Berl Katznelson, one of Mapai's (the pre-Israeli Labor Party) leaders, said Havlagah is a form of self defense meaning "righteousness of weapon" and not hurting innocent life:

David Ben-Gurion, another leader of Mapai, supported the Havlagah for more practical reasons. He noted that the restraint will bring good relations with Britain and a positive sentiment to the Zionist ideology in the world, which will help the efforts for Jewish settlement:

Chief Rabbinate of Israel
Yitzhak HaLevi Herzog, the Ashkenazi Chief Rabbi, said:

Rejection
Irgun members, acting against the Arab aggression and violating the Jewish settlement's decision, referred to themselves as "Havlagah breakers". Their vision was attacking for self-defense. Also, Irgun's policy led revenge actions against innocent Arabs, as a response to the Arab terrorism.

Ze'ev Jabotinsky
Ze'ev Jabotinsky, leader of the Revisionist movement said:

Irgun

David Raziel, commander of Irgun, said that violent reaction will bring an end to the Arab terrorism, because the hostile Arabs "understand power only":

Part of a proclamation 5 months before the 1948 Arab-Israeli War:

"End the passive self-defense! We shall go to the killers' nests and eliminate them! We do not have a quarrel with the Arab people. We seek peace with the near-by nations. But we will cut off the hands of murderers with no mercy. And the murderers are not only inflamed Arab rioters, they are also – or mostly – the emissaries of Nazi sympathizers in Britain."

Impact
Ariel Sharon, shortly after his election as Israeli Prime Minister in the 2001 elections, expressed an unexpected response to the Palestinian terrorism, declaring that "Restraint is Power". In the first two weeks of Sharon's leadership, 20 Israeli civilians were killed by terrorist attacks and Sharon suffered serious criticism from fellow Likud members, such as Benjamin Netanyahu. In this period the terrorist attacks against Israel (such as the Dolphinarium massacre) escalated. In Sharon's February 2002 national speech he said:

Shortly after March 2002, when 130 Israeli civilians were killed by terrorist attacks, Israel commenced Operation Defensive Shield.

See also
Labor Zionism

References

Haganah
Nonviolence
Hebrew words and phrases